Triplophysa longibarbata is a species of ray-finned fish in the genus Triplophysa. This cavefish is only known from Guizhou in China.

Footnotes 

Cave fish
L
Fish described in 1998